Marbais et Lasnier was a French manufacturer of automobiles.

History 
The company both began and ended production of automobiles in 1906.

Vehicles 
Different models were on offer. The smallest model was the 5 CV, with a single-cylinder engine. The largest was the 30 CV with a four-cylinder engine and chain drive.

Notes

Bibliography 
Harald H. Linz, Halwart Schrader: Die Internationale Automobil-Enzyklopädie. Munich: United Soft Media Verlag, 2008. . 
George Nick Georgano (ed.): The Beaulieu Encyclopedia of the Automobile Volume 2. Chicago: G. O. Fitzroy Dearborn Publishers, 2001. .
George Nick Georgano, Thorkil Ry Andersen, et al. Tr. Jacqueline Heymann. Autos. Encyclopédie complète. 1885 à nos jours. 2nd ed. Paris: Courtille, 1977.  

Car manufacturers of France
Vehicle manufacturing companies established in 1906
Vehicle manufacturing companies disestablished in 1906
French companies established in 1906
1906 disestablishments in France